The Kacha Higher Military Aviation twice Red Banner order of Lenin School of Pilots named for A.F. Myasnikov (KVVAUL) (Качинское высшее военное авиационное дважды краснознаменное ордена Ленина училище летчиков им. А.Ф. Мясникова (КВВАУЛ)) was a flying training school of the Soviet Air Forces. It was operational under various names from 1910-97.

The school was established on 21 November 1910 at Sevastopol as the Sevastopol Aviation Officer School.

It gained the name of the Kacha School in 1938. From 1945, after it was evacuated during the Second World War, to 1997 it was headquartered at Stalingrad (1945–61, later renamed Volgograd (1961 onwards)), and was part of the Air Forces of the North Caucasus Military District. From 1960-December 1997 it had three (sometimes four) flying training regiments (704th (Kotelnikovo, Volgograd Oblast), 706th, 707th at Lebyazhye initially, 122nd activated later).

On the disbandment of the school in 1998 the 706th Training Aviation Regiment was transferred to the Krasnodar Military Aviation Institute. It was still active under the Krasnodar Military Aviation Institute in January 2000.

External links
Michael Holm, http://www.ww2.dk/new/air%20force/division/schools/kvvaul.htm

Flying training schools of the Soviet Union
Military units and formations established in 1910
Military units and formations disestablished in 1997